Bow is an unincorporated community in Cumberland County, Kentucky, United States.  It lies along Route 90 southeast of the city of Burkesville, the county seat of Cumberland County.  Its elevation is 607 feet (185 m).

References

Unincorporated communities in Cumberland County, Kentucky
Unincorporated communities in Kentucky